Myrmica afghanica is a species of ant from Afghanistan and India.

References
 Radchenko A, Elmes GW 2003. Myrmica afghanica, a new ant species from Afghanistan Zootaxa 375: 1–8.

Myrmica
Insects described in 2003